Dynowarz: Destruction of Spondylus is a game by Bandai for the Nintendo Entertainment System. It was released in 1990 in North America.

Gameplay

There are two modes of gameplay. The player controls either Professor Proteus in his battlesuit, or Cyborasaurus, a truly devastating Robosaur. Capsules that Robosaurs drop can help to keep these two entities alive. Capsules labeled "E" will fully replenish the player's energy. Capsules labeled "B" give the player a full barrier meter. Any damage taken will deplete the barrier meter before affecting the energy meter.

Stages, each on different planets ranging from ice to jungle, begin by piloting Cyborasaurus. The goal is to get to the Artificial Intelligence Compound of each planet. Hoards of Robosaurs stand in the way of Cyborasaurus, including a boss of each level. These behemoths can take far more damage than standard Robosaurs. When defeated, the boss will leave behind a key to the AIC.

When in the AIC, Proteus exits Cyborasaurus. Every AIC has a Life-Support Computer that has been infected with a virus  which must be destroyed. Platforms of Deception, Flying Hounds of Destruction, and other obstacles must be circumnavigated before battle with the hideous pulsating Life-Support Computer can begin. When the computer is destroyed, all beasts in the AIC are destroyed along with it. Proteus must then retrace his steps back to Cyborasaurus. Cyborasaurus then must use the Molecular Transporter outside to travel to the next planet.

Reception
Dynowarz: Destruction of Spondylus received mostly negative reviews. Criticisms included the game's unbalanced gameplay, low quality graphics, and numerous bugs. Nintendo Power magazine awarded the game a 13 out of 20 on issue 10. Positive elements mentioned by reviewers include the game's cut scene animations, soundtrack  and several of the power ups found throughout the game.

External links
1up Page on Dynowarz

IMDb page on Dynowarz: Destruction of Spondylus

References

1990 video games
Bandai games
Dinosaurs in video games
Nintendo Entertainment System games
Nintendo Entertainment System-only games
Fictional robotic dinosaurs
North America-exclusive video games
Platform games
Science fiction video games
Video games developed in Japan